Svetlogorsky (masculine), Svetlogorskaya (feminine), or Svetlogorskoye (neuter) may refer to:
Svetlogorsky District, a district of Kaliningrad Oblast, Russia
Svetlogorskoye Urban Settlement, a municipal formation which the town of district significance of Svetlogorsk in Svetlogorsky District of Kaliningrad Oblast, Russia is incorporated as
Svetlogorsky (inhabited locality) (Svetlogorskaya, Svetlogorskoye), several rural localities in Russia
Svietlahorsk Rajon (Svetlogorsky District), a district of Gomel Oblast, Belarus